Kamyshenka is a rural locality (a selo) in Uspenovsky Selsoviet of Zavitinsky District, Amur Oblast, Russia. The population was 200 as of 2018. There are 3 streets.

Geography 
Kamyshenka is located 11 km west of Zavitinsk (the district's administrative centre) by road. Uspenovka is the nearest rural locality.

References 

Rural localities in Zavitinsky District